Edible plant stems are one part of plants that are eaten by humans. Most plants are made up of stems, roots, leaves, flowers, and produce fruits containing seeds. Humans  most commonly eat the seeds (e.g. maize, wheat),  fruit (e.g. tomato, avocado, banana), flowers (e.g. broccoli), leaves (e.g. lettuce, spinach, and cabbage), roots (e.g. carrots, beets), and stems (e.g. [asparagus] of many plants. There are also a few edible petioles (also known as leaf stems) such as celery or rhubarb.

Plant stems have a variety of functions. Stems support the entire plant and have buds, leaves, flowers, and fruits. Stems are also a vital connection between leaves and roots. They conduct water and mineral nutrients through xylem tissue from roots upward, and organic compounds and some mineral nutrients through phloem tissue in any direction within the plant. Apical meristems, located at the shoot tip and axillary buds on the stem, allow plants to increase in length, surface, and mass. In some plants, such as cactus, stems are specialized for photosynthesis and water storage.

Modified stems
Typical stems are located above ground, but there are modified stems that can be found either above or below ground. Modified stems located above ground are phylloids, stolons, runners, or spurs. Modified stems located below ground are corms, rhizomes, and tubers.

Detailed description of edible plant stems

 Asparagus  The edible portion is the rapidly emerging stems that arise from the crowns in the

 Bamboo  The edible portion is the young shoot (culm).

 Birch  Trunk sap is drunk as a tonic or rendered into birch syrup, vinegar, beer, soft drinks, and other foods.

 Broccoli  The edible portion is the peduncle stem tissue, flower buds, and some small leaves.

 Cauliflower  The edible portion is proliferated peduncle and flower tissue.

 Cinnamon  Many favor the unique sweet flavor of the inner bark of cinnamon, and it is commonly used as a spice.

 Fig  The edible portion is stem tissue. The fig "fruit" is actually an inverted flower cluster with both the male and female flower parts enclosed inside the base of the inflorescence, corresponding to the peduncle.

 Ginger root  The edible portion is a branched underground compressed stem also referred to as a rhizome.

 Kohlrabi  The edible portion is an enlarged (swollen) hypocotyl. It is a member of the cabbage family and is white, green, or purple in color.

 Lotus root  The edible portion is a stem modified for underwater growth. Buds and branches are visible on the vegetable sold as lotus root.

 Potato  The edible portion is a rhizome (an underground stem) that is also a tuber. The "eyes" of the potato are lateral buds. Potatoes come in white, yellow, orange, or purple-colored varieties.

 Sugar cane  The edible portion is the inner stalk (stem) whose sap is a source of sugar. In its raw form chewing or extraction through a juicer extracts its juice.

 Sugar maple  Xylem sap from the tree trunks is made into maple sugar and maple syrup.

 Taro  The edible portion is the underground stem (corm).

 Wasabi  In addition to its edible stem, the leaves and rhizomes of the plant are edible. It has an interesting spicy taste.

 White pine  The sweet inner bark (phloem) was eaten by Native Americans.

Some wild plants with edible stems
There are also many wild edible plant stems. In North America, these include the shoots of woodsorrel (usually eaten along with the leaves), chickweeds, galinsoga, common purslane, Japanese knotweed, winter cress and other wild mustards, thistles (de-thorned), stinging nettles (cooked), bellworts, violets, amaranth and slippery elm, among many others. Also, some wild plants with edible rhizomes (underground, horizontal stems) can be found, such as arrowhead or cattail. Wild edible stems, like their domestic relatives, are usually only good when young and growing. Many of these also require preparation (as do many domestic plants, such as the potato), so it is wise to read up on the plant before experimenting with eating it.

Sources and external links
Albuquerque Master Gardeners. (2005, May 23). Basic Plant Science (Botany). Retrieved July 15, 2005, from www.nmmastergardeners.org/Manual%20etc/Supplementfiles/Botany.htm
Hershey, D. (2001, May 4). Re: What plant parts do we eat?. Message posted to www.madsci.org
Lineberger, D. (spring 2005). Aggie Horticulture’s edible botany. Retrieved July 15, 2005, from aggie-horticulture.tamu.edu/syllabi/201h/ediblebotany/index.html
McEachern, G. R. (1996, December 9). Figs. Retrieved July 15, 2005, from aggie-horticulture.tamu.edu/extension/fruit/figs/figs.html
Oregon State University Extension Service. (1999). Master Gardener Handbook: external plant parts—stems. Retrieved July 15, 2005, from extension.oregonstate.edu/mg/botany/stems6.html
Wilson, H. D. (1998, July 7). Plants and People—Botany 328, Lab 1—Plant Vegetative Morphology and Vegetables. Retrieved July 15, 2005, from www.csdl.tamu.edu/FLORA/Wilson/pp/su98/veglablist.htm
Institute for the Study of Edible Wild Plants & Other Foragables Link

 

Vegetables, stem